Nauru competed at the 2000 Summer Olympics in Sydney, Australia.

Weightlifter and future President Marcus Stephen bore the Olympic torch during its stopover in Nauru.

Background

The Nauru Olympic Committee was recognized by the International Olympic Committee on 1 January 1994. The 2000 Summer Olympics were held from 15 September to 1 October 2000; a total of 10,651 athletes represented 199 National Olympic Committees.

Athletics
Men

Weightlifting

Men

Women

References

Wallechinsky, David (2004). The Complete Book of the Summer Olympics (Athens 2004 Edition). Toronto, Canada. .
International Olympic Committee (2001). The Results. Retrieved 12 November 2005.
Sydney Organising Committee for the Olympic Games (2001). Official Report of the XXVII Olympiad Volume 1: Preparing for the Games. Retrieved 20 November 2005.
Sydney Organising Committee for the Olympic Games (2001). Official Report of the XXVII Olympiad Volume 2: Celebrating the Games. Retrieved 20 November 2005.
Sydney Organising Committee for the Olympic Games (2001). The Results. Retrieved 20 November 2005.
International Olympic Committee Web Site

Nations at the 2000 Summer Olympics
2000
2000 in Nauruan sport